Gerald Roche Lynch OBE FRIC DPH (1889–1957) was a British forensic scientist and public health analyst associated with several infamous murders as a medico-legal expert. An expert on poisons he appeared as an expert witness in multiple murder cases in the 20th century.

His involvement in high profile (and often gory) murder investigations made him a household name in the 1930s.

He was an important part of the oddly named "Bastardy (Blood Tests) Bill" of 1939, concluding that such tests could accurately prove paternity (the accuracy was much less than modern DNA testing).

Life

He was born in the Notting Hill district of London on 12 January 1889 the son of Dr Jordan Roche Lynch. He was educated at St Paul's School, London then studied Medicine with a scholarship to St Mary's Hospital Medical School in London from 1906. He graduated MB in 1913.

In the First World War he served as an assistant physician with the Royal Navy. After the he worked with Sir William Willcox and in 1920 (aged only 31) replaced him representing the Home Office in officially assisting the CID in criminal investigations involving poison, bringing him frequently to work alongside Sir Bernard Spilsbury. He became Director of Chemical Pathology at St Mary's Hospital on behalf of the Home Office in 1936.

He lived at 17 Upper Addison Gardens in the Holland Park district of London.

He served as President of the Royal Institute of Chemistry from 1946 to 1949.

He retired in the Autumn of 1954 and died at home in Slough suddenly on 3 July 1957.

Notable Cases
Browne and Kennedy's murder of PC Gutteridge (1928)
Edmund Duff / Violet Sydney (1928)
Sidney Fox (1930)
Sarah Ann Everard (aka Annie Hearn) (1931)
Murder of Edith Rosse by Maundy Gregory (1932)
Vera Page (1932)1957 
Brighton trunk murders (1934)
Ethel Major (1934)
Dorothea Waddingham (1936)
Cheltenham torso mystery (1938)4
The unsolved William Murfitt murder (1938)
August Sangret (1943)

Publications
Cases of Poisoning and Suspected Poisoning (1927)
Evidence of Blood Groups (1933)
Poisons and Their Detection (1935)
Blood Group Tests in Disputed Paternity (1937)
Toxicology: Homicidal, Suicidal and Accidental Poisoning

Family

In 1919 he married Sybil Marguerite Pinnock who died very young. They had a daughter, Bridget Roche Lynch.

References
 

1889 births
1957 deaths
Forensic scientists
People from Notting Hill